White is the fifth studio album released by Angela Aki, released on September 28, 2011 in two editions, standard and limited. The limited one includes a bonus DVD with a music video of "Hajimari no Ballad" and performance footage held at a museum in June 2011.

Singles
 Hajimari no Ballad (始まりのバラード; Ballad of Beginning) is the only single from the album, released in the physical format on June 8, 2011. "Hajimari no Ballad" was used as the theme song for the Japanese dorama Namae wo Nakushita, Megami and "I Have a Dream", a song included in the CD, was used as the theme song for the Washington National Gallery of Art Exhibit in Japan iPhone app.

Other songs 
 Tsugaru Kaikyō Fuyugeshiki (津軽海峡・冬景色; Tsugaru Strait • Winter Landscape) was used in a TV commercial for Uniqlo's 2011 winter collection in Japan.

Track listing
CD

			 
DVD

Charts

Release history

References

External links
Oricon Profile: Limited Edition  | Regular Edition
Sony Music Profile Limited Edition | Regular Edition

2011 albums
Angela Aki albums
Sony Music Entertainment Japan albums